The CIBC Building is a high-rise office building in the downtown core of Halifax, Nova Scotia, Canada. It is located on Barrington Street and is owned and operated by Crombie REIT. The office tower stands at 66 metres and has 16 floors. It was completed in 1977. Most of Halifax's office towers are lined along the city's harbour. The building is connected to the Downtown Halifax Link system.

See also
 List of buildings in the Halifax Regional Municipality
 TD Centre, a building directly beside the CIBC building.

References

Buildings and structures in Halifax, Nova Scotia
Bank buildings in Canada
Modernist architecture in Canada
Canadian Imperial Bank of Commerce

Office buildings completed in 1977